The Singapore Armed Forces Best Unit Competition is an annual competition which confers awards of recognition to the most outstanding units of the Singapore Armed Forces (SAF) in combat readiness, operational proficiency and administrative excellence. Besides encouraging the above, the award also seeks to promote esprit-de-corps and camaraderie among participating Army, Air Force and Navy units through friendly competition.

The assessment factors of the competition are:

 Combat Proficiency Test
 Marksmanship Test
 Individual Physical Proficiency Test
 Standard Obstacle Course
 Unarmed Combat
 Security
 Manpower Matters
 Logistics Readiness Inspection
 Vehicle State
 Training Safety

The competition was started for active SAF units in 1969, before being extended to the reservist units (now known as NS units) in 1993. These units are conferred their awards at the annual Singapore Armed Forces Day parade.

The types of units that participate include:
Singapore Infantry Regiment (SIR)
Singapore Combat Engineers (SCE)
Ordnance Supply Base (OSB), the Kranji base

Past active unit winners

Active Army units 
The 1st Commando Battalion has won the Best Combat Unit for an unprecedented 35 times since the award was launched in 1969, and for 18 consecutive years since 2004.

Retired award

Active Navy units

Two new awards in maritime security and in naval engineering and logistics were introduced in 2015.

Active Air Force units
The Best Helicopter Squadron award was introduced in 2010 to recognise the contributions of the RSAF helicopter squadrons. In 2014, two new awards in Control and Air Engineering were introduced. A new award in air logistics was introduced in 2015. 140 SQN currently holds the record for clinching the Best fighter Squadron 12 times.

Past National Service unit winners

Army NS units

Retired award

Naval NS units

A new Best Naval NS Unit award was introduced from 2015.

Controversies

In 2003, the 1st Commando Battalion was barred from the competition after it was found guilty of doctoring score-keeping records and fitness test results.

In 2009, three regulars from the 24th Battalion Singapore Artillery were convicted of falsifying their unit's test scores. Soldiers' results for the standard obstacle were doctored. As a result, the unit was disqualified that year and the trio were convicted and fined by the General Court Martial.

References

External links

Press releases

 Factsheet - List of Best NS Unit Competition Winners 2000
 Factsheet: Best Unit Award Winners for SAF Day 2006
 Factsheet: Best Unit Award Winners for SAF Day 2007
 Factsheet: Best Unit Award Winners for SAF Day 2008
 Factsheet: Best Unit Award Winners for SAF Day 2009
 Fact Sheet: Best Unit Award Winners (for 2010)
 Fact Sheet: Full List of Winners (for 2011)
 Fact Sheet: Singapore Armed Forces Best Unit Competition 2012
 Fact Sheet: Full List of Winners (for 2013)
 Winners of Best Unit Competition 2014
 Factsheet: Winners of Best Unit Competition 2015
 Fact Sheet: Winners of Best Unit Competition 2016
 Fact Sheet: Winners of Best Unit Competition 2017
Fact Sheet: Winners of Best Unit Competition 2018
Fact Sheet: Winners of Best Unit Competition 2019
Fact Sheet: Winners of Best Unit Competition 2020

Video clips
, accessed 4 December 2008.

Military of Singapore
SAF best units